Tomás Velasco (born 21 December 1914, date of death unknown) was a Spanish cross-country skier. He competed in the men's 18 kilometre event at the 1936 Winter Olympics.

References

1914 births
Year of death missing
Spanish male cross-country skiers
Olympic cross-country skiers of Spain
Cross-country skiers at the 1936 Winter Olympics
Sportspeople from the Province of Segovia